The 2013–14 Turkish Airlines Euroleague was the 14th season of the modern era of Euroleague Basketball and the fourth under the title sponsorship of the Turkish Airlines. Including the competition's previous incarnation as the FIBA Europe Champions Cup, this was the 57th season of the premier competition for European men's clubs.

Euroleague Basketball Company, in its annual meeting in Barcelona, determined the site of the season's Euroleague Final Four venue. London was originally supposed to host the Final Four, but it was decided that the 2014 Euroleague Final Four be held at the Mediolanum Forum, in Milan. In the championship final game, Maccabi Electra Tel Aviv defeated the previous season's runners-up, Real Madrid, by a score of 98-86 after overtime, and won its sixth Euroleague title in the club's history.

Allocation
There were three routes to participation in the Euroleague:

 The 14 teams with an A-Licence from the 2012–13 Euroleague, based on their Euroleague Club Ranking.
 The 2012–13 Eurocup winner was given a C-Licence.
 14 places were allocated from a list of 30 teams given a B-Licence ranked according to their European national basketball league rankings over the last year. 14 teams were given both an A-Licence or C-Licence and a B-Licence. When a country ranking spot had already been assigned to an A-Licence team, the assignation jumped to the next country appearing in the ranking, and their league was not granted an additional place in the competition. The first 8 of the remaining 16 teams were given places in the regular-season, and the next 6 were given places in the qualifying competition.
 If the Eurocup champion was qualified by receiving a B license, or some team with it resigned from the competition, a wild card had to be given by the Euroleague.

The Euroleague had the right to cancel an A license for one of the following reasons: 

The club had the lowest ranking of all clubs with an A Licence according to the Club Ranking.
The club had ranked among the clubs placed in the bottom half of the national championship final standings.
The club had financial problems.
In the ACB (Spain), when the champion and/or the runner-up of the league were teams without an A license. In that case, the A license club with the lowest position would play Eurocup in the next season. If that happened three times in five years, the A license of the club would be cancelled.

Euroleague allocation criteria

A licenses
Classification after the 2012–13 season, including also the 2010–11 and the 2011–12 seasons.

Notes
 EA7 Milano had a two-year A license, awarded in June 2012.
 Asseco Prokom lost its A license, as it was the last qualified in the A licensed team tanking. The license was converted into a wildcard.

B licenses
B licenses could be given to every team without an A license. If in the allocation appeared a team with an A license, the next team in the criteria would receive the B license, which qualified directly to the Regular Season.

Notes
Adriatic: the places were awarded to the top teams in the Regular Season. If the third or fourth qualified won the Final Four, it would be granted with the first spot, moving the champion and the runner-up of the Regular Season to the second and third spots. In February 2012, Euroleague Basketball clarified the situation of the Adriatic League spots, saying the three first teams in the Adriatic League Final Four would qualify. Due to the different interpretation of both associations, Euroleague and Liga ABA negotiated a solution to be applied only for the 2012–13 season.

Finally, both organizations agreed that if the team that was in the first position after the Regular Season met all of the B-licence minimum requirements, it would qualify to Euroleague. In that case, Igokea did not meet the required criteria, so Euroleague Basketball applied the 2012–13 Euroleague Bylaws, by which the 2013 ABA Final Four champion and the runner-up, would take the first two Adriatic positions in that order, whilst the next highest regular season team would take the final Adriatic position.

Russia: the places were awarded to the best teams, by a ranking determined by their positions in the VTB United League, and Russian Professional Basketball League. VTB points prevail in case of tie.

C licenses and wild cards
To the Regular Season
Vacant C license of Lokomotiv Kuban (2012–13 Eurocup champion), qualified with a B license, Asseco Prokom's lost A license, and the B license rejected by Acea Roma converted to a wild card:
  Strasbourg
  Budivelnyk
  Bayern Munich

To the Qualification Rounds
  Khimki
  Cimberio Varèse

Competition format changes
As new, for this Euroleague season, the eliminated teams in the Regular Season, were dropped to the Eurocup.

Teams
The labels in the parentheses show how each team qualified for the place of its starting round (TH: Euroleague title holders):
A: Qualified through an A–licence
1st, 2nd, etc.: League position after Playoffs
QR: Qualifying rounds
WC: Wild card
EC: Champion of the 2012–13 Eurocup Basketball

Qualifying rounds

The eight teams participated in a single-venue tournament format, from October 1 until October 4, 2013. All games were played in the Siemens Arena in Vilnius, Lithuania.

Draw
The draws for the 2013–14 Turkish Airlines Euroleague were held on Thursday, 4 July.
Teams were seeded into six pots of four teams in accordance with the Club Ranking, based on their performance in European competitions during a three-year period.

Two teams from the same country could not be drawn together in the same Regular Season group.

Regular season

The regular season was played between October 17 and December 20.

If teams were level on record at the end of the Regular Season, tiebreakers were applied in the following order:
 Head-to-head record.
 Head-to-head point differential.
 Point differential during the Regular Season.
 Points scored during the regular season.
 Sum of quotients of points scored and points allowed in each Regular Season match.

Top 16

The Top 16 began on January 2 and ended on April 11, 2014.

If teams were level on record at the end of the Top 16, tiebreakers were applied in the following order:
 Head-to-head record.
 Head-to-head record between teams still tied.
 Head-to-head point differential.
 Point differential during the Top 16.
 Points scored during the Top 16.
 Sum of quotients of points scored and points allowed in each Top 16 match.

See the detailed group stage page for tiebreakers if two or more teams were equal on points.

Quarterfinals

Team 1 hosted Games 1 and 2, plus Game 5 if necessary. Team 2 hosted Game 3, and Game 4 if necessary.

Final Four

The Final Four was the last phase of the season and was held over a weekend. The semifinal games were played on 16 May, while the third place game and championship game were played on 18 May. The Final Four was held at the Mediolanum Forum in Milan, Italy.

Attendances

Top 10

Average home attendances

 Updated to reflect games played through 25 April 2014
Source: Euroleague Basketball

Individual statistics

Rating

Points

Rebounds

Assists

Other statistics

Game highs

Awards

Euroleague 2013–14 MVP 
  Sergio Rodríguez (  Real Madrid)

Euroleague 2013–14 Final Four MVP 
  Tyrese Rice (  Maccabi Electra Tel Aviv)

All-Euroleague Team 2013–14

Top Scorer (Alphonso Ford Trophy)
  Keith Langford (  EA7 Milano)

Best Defender
  Bryant Dunston (  Olympiacos)

Rising Star
  Bogdan Bogdanović (  Partizan)

Coach of the Year (Alexander Gomelsky Award)
  David Blatt (  Maccabi Electra Tel Aviv)

MVP Weekly

Regular season

Top 16

Quarter-finals

MVP of the Month

See also 

2013–14 Eurocup Basketball
2013–14 EuroChallenge

References 

 
2013-14